Luís Howorth (11 March 1909 – 10 February 1977) was a Portuguese sports shooter. He competed in two events at the 1952 Summer Olympics.

References

1909 births
1977 deaths
Portuguese male sport shooters
Olympic shooters of Portugal
Shooters at the 1952 Summer Olympics
Sportspeople from Lisbon